Sticta papillata is a species of foliose lichen in the family Peltigeraceae. Found in Colombia, it was formally described by Bibiana Moncada and Robert Lücking in 2012. The lichen grows on the bark of shrubs and trees, often in association with liverworts of the genera Radula and Metzgeria, as well as Leptogium lichens. The specific epithet refers to the characteristic papillae (small protrusions) that occur on the cells of the basal membrane of the cyphellae.

References

papillata
Lichen species
Lichens described in 2012
Lichens of Colombia
Taxa named by Robert Lücking